Akhund Azizullah Muttalawi. was a Muslim theologian from Sindh. He is considered to be the first person who translated the Quran from Arabic to Sindhi. The translation was published in 1870.

See also 
 List of translations of the Quran

References 

Sindhi people
Translators from Arabic
Translators of the Quran into Sindhi
 People from Matiari District